The second Connecticut House of Representatives district elects one member of the Connecticut House of Representatives. Its current representative is Raghib Allie-Brennan. The district consists of parts of the towns of Bethel, Redding, Newtown, and part of the city of Danbury.
 
Prior to 2002, the 2nd District was one of six districts located entirely within the city of Hartford, but its old boundaries were abolished due to population decline in Hartford and the district was added to suburban Fairfield County, an area of much faster growth.

List of representatives

Recent elections

2022

2008

Elections before boundary change

External links 
 Google Maps - Connecticut House Districts

References

02